Set It Off is a 1996 American heist crime action film directed by F. Gary Gray and written by Kate Lanier and Takashi Bufford. The film stars Jada Pinkett, Queen Latifah, Vivica A. Fox, and Kimberly Elise (in her film acting debut). It follows four close friends in Los Angeles, California, who plan to execute a bank robbery—each doing so for different reasons—to achieve better for themselves and their families.

The film was a box office success, grossing over $41 million against a budget of $9 million. The film earned positive reviews from critics, who praised the characters, music and performances of the cast (particularly that of Pinkett and Latifah), as well as the chemistry of the four leading actresses. The soundtrack was a commercial success, peaking at number four on the Billboard 200 and number three on the Top R&B/Hip-Hop Albums. Additionally, the singles "Set It Off", "Don't Let Go (Love)", "Days of Our Livez", "Angel", "Come On", "Let It Go" and "Missing You" each charted.

Plot 
Francesca "Frankie" Sutton (Fox) is a Los Angeles bank teller who is fired after a robbery, because she recognized one of the robbers, although she did not personally know him. Frankie goes to work at Luther's Janitorial Services with her three best friends, Lida "Stony" Newsom (Pinkett), Cleopatra "Cleo" Sims (Latifah), and Tisean "T.T." Williams (Elise). The owner, Luther, treats them with disrespect and pays them paltry wages. 

Tired of working a low-paying job, Cleo explains that they should rob a bank themselves. Frankie agrees, but Stony and T.T. are reluctant. However, after Stony's younger brother is gunned down by the police in a case of mistaken identity and T.T.'s son is taken away from her by Child Protective Services, they too now have the motivation to join the robbery.

While casing a bank with T.T., Stony meets bank manager Keith Weston, whom she starts dating. The four women embark on a series of successful bank robberies, due to Frankie's inside knowledge of bank protocol with money and security. An investigation by LAPD Detective Strode ensues. Strode suspects that Cleo (because of her prior convictions), Frankie (because of her inadvertent connection to the earlier robbery and subsequent firing) and Stony (because of her brother's death) are involved. But his superior refuses to allow him to bring them in for questioning because he doesn't feel the evidence is sufficient.

Concerned with the safety of their money, the four women stash the money in an air vent at one of their work sites. However, when Cleo, Frankie, and T.T. show up for work one day and find a new boss in charge, they quickly realize that Luther has discovered the money and fled with it. While Stony attends a banking event with Keith, the three women track Luther to a motel, where he is sleeping with a prostitute.

The women demand the return of their money, but Luther refuses to give it up and pulls a gun on Cleo, forcing T.T. to shoot him dead in self-defense. Cleo is soon brought in by Strode over for questioning for Luther's murder, but manages to intimidate the prostitute into not identifying her. Later, after hearing what happened, Stony is disappointed with Frankie and T.T. about the missing money and Luther's death. They debate robbing another bank, but Stony is reluctant. Eventually, Frankie and Cleo persuade her and T.T. that they need to rob another bank and leave town the next day.

The women decide to rob the Downtown Federal bank, where Keith works. Concerned for Keith's safety and not wanting him to know she's a bank robber, Stony calls Keith and tells him to meet her at a cafe, far from the bank's location. The four women quickly execute the robbery, but Cleo demands that T.T. grab more money, which gives Strode enough time to arrive.

Strode and his partner try to talk them into surrendering. As T.T. and Stony begin to put down their weapons, a bank security guard shoots T.T. A shootout ensues as Stony shoots the guard, and an enraged Cleo opens fire on the detectives. The women eventually drive away, though T.T. succumbs to her wounds and dies in Stony's arms. The three remaining women attempt to outrun the police in vain. Cleo tells Stony and Frankie that they have to split up and to take her share of the money with them.

The police find Cleo, who proceeds to lead them on a high speed chase until she is cornered. She drives through a police barricade, which causes the police to shoot at her car and blow out her tires. Refusing to surrender, she leaps from her car firing her gun, and is killed by the police, to the dismay of her girlfriend Ursula and friends from the neighborhood watching the chase on TV. A short time later, Frankie is found, and Strode attempts to get Frankie to surrender. After defiantly sticking a gun in Strode's face and reminding him of how he got her fired to begin with, Frankie attempts to run, but one of the officers shoots her in the back, killing her. Stony, who managed to blend in with a tourist group heading to Mexico, tearfully watches this from a passing charter bus. Strode sees her from a distance but lets her go, realizing the part he played in driving the women to crime.

In Mexico, Stony mourns the losses of her friends and brother, and cuts off her hair. She then calls Keith to assure him that she is alright and thanks him before smiling. After hanging up, she is seen driving through the mountains with her share of the money from the last robbery beside her.

Cast
 Jada Pinkett as Lida "Stony" Newsome
 Queen Latifah as Cleopatra "Cleo" Sims
 Vivica A. Fox as Francesca "Frankie" Sutton
 Kimberly Elise as Tisean "T.T." Williams
 John C. McGinley as Detective Strode
 Blair Underwood as Keith Weston
 Ella Joyce as Detective Waller
 Chaz Lamar Shepherd as Stevie Newsome
 Thomas Jefferson Byrd as Luther
 Charlie Robinson as Nate Andrews
 Samuel Monroe Jr. as Lorenz
 Dr. Dre as Black Sam
 WC as Darnell
 Vincent Baum as Jajuan
Jeris Lee Poindexter as Pete Rodney
 Samantha MacLachlan as Ursula

Production
Takashi Bufford said that he wrote the script with Pinkett Smith and Queen Latifah in mind even though he had not yet met them. The script was offered to New Line three times before finally being accepted, and the studio filled in more about why the female leads turn to bank robbery in a way that wasn't in the original script. Later Vivica A. Fox said: “Originally, with the script, we were throwing out pages daily. Like, “No.” But that’s what you do when you have a good director who knows what he has to turn in. We were given the freedom with him to create things, and dialogue that would make sense. Everyone; once it started making sense, we came up with little moments, and it really was a team effort, to make that movie so successful.

Reception

Box office
On a budget of $9 million and R-rated, Set It Off grossed $36,461,139 in the U.S. and Canada, $5,129,747 internationally, and total of $41,590,886 worldwide. Tribute magazine stated that it is New Line Cinema's highest-grossing film of 1996. Director F. Gary Gray won an Acapulco Black Film Festival award for Best Director, in 1997, and the Special Jury Prize at the Cognac Film Festival.

Critical response
Set It Off received generally positive reviews from critics and audiences. On Rotten Tomatoes, it has an approval rating of 71% based on 34 reviews, with an average rating of 6.4 out of 10. The site's consensus reads: "It may not boast an original plot, but Set It Off is a satisfying, socially conscious heist film thanks largely to fine performances from its leads." Audiences surveyed by CinemaScore gave the film a grade "A" on scale of A to F.

Roger Ebert stated that Set It Off is "a lot more" than a thriller about four women who rob banks. Comparing it to Waiting to Exhale, but "with a strong jolt of reality," he said, "It creates a portrait of the lives of these women that's so observant and informed." He gave the film three and a half stars, and added, "The movie surprised and moved me: I expected a routine action picture and was amazed how much I started to care about the characters." Gene Siskel gave it a thumbs down.

Stephen Holden of The New York Times compared Set It Off to Thelma & Louise, stating, "In formulaic Hollywood terms, Set It Off might be described as Thelma and Louise Ride Shotgun in the Hood While Waiting to Exhale. A pop psychologist might translate the story into a fable called Women Who Rob Banks and the Society That Hates Them." He added that among "the long list of Hollywood heist movies that make you root for its criminals to steal a million dollars and live happily ever after, F. Gary Gray's film Set It Off is one of the most poignantly impassioned," and that "[i]f this messy roller coaster of a film often seems to be going in several directions at once, it never for a second loses empathy" for the female robbers.

James Berardinelli said that if Set It Off owes any debt to films, those films are Thelma & Louise and Dead Presidents, rather than Waiting to Exhale. He stated that "[t]here's a freshness and energy in the way director F. Gary Gray attacks this familiar material that keeps Set It Off entertaining, even during its weakest moments" and that "[t]he concept of four black action heroines makes for a welcome change in a genre that is dominated by: (a) rugged white males with a perpetual five o'clock shadow, (b) rugged white males who speak English with an accent, and (c) rugged white males with the acting ability of a fence post." Berardinelli added that although "[t]he film doesn't get off to a promising start" and "[t]he first half-hour, which details the various characters' motives for becoming involved in a bank robbery, is unevenly scripted," and that some aspects of the plot are contrived, "[o]nce the setup is complete, however, things shift into high gear. The remainder of the film, which includes several high-adrenaline action sequences and some slower, more dramatic moments, is smoothly-crafted. There are occasional missteps, such as an out-of-place Godfather parody, but, in general, Set It Off manages to rise above these."

Humanities academic Kara Keeling asserts the film's significance to queer film studies within her article '"What's Up with That? She Don't Talk?," in which she establishes Cleo and Ursula's relationship's significance to butch/femme representation, utilizing concepts of blaxploitation and ghettocentrism.

Music

Soundtrack

The soundtrack was released on September 24, 1996, by East West Records and featured production from several of hip hop and R&B's top producers, such as Organized Noize, DJ U-Neek and DJ Rectangle. The soundtrack was a huge success, making it to number four on the Billboard 200 and number three on the Top R&B/Hip-Hop Albums. It featured seven charting singles: "Set It Off", "Don't Let Go (Love)", "Days of Our Livez", "Angel", "Come On", "Let It Go" and "Missing You". All of the singles had music videos made for them. The track "The Heist" by Da 5 Footaz also had a music video made, even though it was not released as a single. On November 12, 1996, the album was certified platinum by the RIAA.

"Up Against the Wind" (runtime – 4:28), sung by Lori Perri and produced by Christopher Young, is not included in the soundtrack.

Score

Varèse Sarabande issued an album of Christopher Young's score for the film, including Lori Perri's "Up Against the Wind" on November 19, 1996.

Legacy

Cultural impact 
Set It Off became known as a staple in urban cinema as a cult classic. The film was also the center of many parodies and attracted spoofs in television, YouTube and social media alike with creators and actors recreating memorable scenes from the movie, particularly the rooftop scene; Stony's desperate decision to obtain money for her brother; the fight between Cleo and Stony and the final standoff scene. Notable social media creators and stand-up comedian/actor KevOnStage appeared as a detective in one of the 2014 parodies with content creators All Def Women, as well as social media actor and comedian Minks (officalminks) recreated and spoofed the final standoff scene in 2018.

Queen Latifah reprised her role as 'Cleo" in a 1997 MADtv sketch with Phil Lamarr as weird stud 'Rick', who was trying to charm Cleo in a bar by coming on too strong, she dismisses him by threatening him with a gun, but assures him to relax and ask him if he has a car in which he gives her the keys. She tells him to relax and wants him to meet her friends (Stony, TT and Frankie) but first needs to stop at a local bank first. They leave as she calls her girlfriend Ursula, who was sitting at the bar to tag along. The sketch can be internalized and interpreted as possibly one the events that happened early on before the demise and downfall of the girls.

Queen Latifah also surprised Anthony Anderson with the cast reunion (Jada, Vivica & Kimberly) as a spoof while presenting Best Male R&B artist at the 2005 BET Awards trying to antagonize and rob him of his clothing.

The climatic song "Up Against the Wind" sung by Lori Perry became a popular viral internet meme sound bite in the late 2010s used in many TikTok and Instagram videos with only the music melody or piano instrument leading up to the vocal lyrics 'Day after Day'', usually following from something either sad, ridiculous, or embarrassing happening or a person throwing insults and shade in the video clip, sometimes added with the sound bite of a gunshot sound effect and/or vocal emotion of "Bruh!!!" before or following Lori's vocals of the lyric.

The film drew many people to believe there would be a sequel after the cliffhanger at the end to which Jada Pinkett-Smith answered when asked in an interview with PeopleTV a subsidiary of Entertainment Weekly stating, "That has been going on for years...my answer always is, there's no way I can do 'Set if Off' without Vivica, Queen and Kimberly, that's just not gonna happen. Sometimes you gotta let a classic be a classic and just don't touch it.". ET Live also asked Vivica Fox the same question regarding Issa Rae possibly making an attempt to create a sequel, to which Vivica made a disappointed face and stated "It's a classic, leave it alone there's absolutely no reason to try to redo it, its been done, and we did it so well that people are absolutely going to compare it and I think that's her taking on a tremendous chore because that film has become a cult classic and some things are better left (alone)...create your own thing...and if its not good they are going to slay her for it."

Time Magazine listed 'Set it Off''' as one of 'The 25 Best Heist Movies' in 2017.

 Stage play adaptation 
Stage theater director and producer Je’Caryous Johnson, a well known renowned playwright in urban stage play productions, adapted Set It Off as an Off-Broadway play titled 'SET IT OFF: Live on Stage with the blessing of creator and writer of the movie, Takashi Bufford. The stage play had a multi-city tour production run in 2018 and 2021 with Da Brat starring as Cleo in both 2018 and 2021 productions. The 2018 main cast featured Kyla Pratt as Stony, LeToya Luckett as Frankie and Demetria McKinney as Tisean (T.T.). The 2021 cast featured  Keshia Knight Pulliam as Tisean, Lil' Mo and Vanessa Simmons as Frankie (alternating shows), Drew Sidora, LaToya London and Marquita Goings as Stony (alternating shows) and Leon Robinson was added to the cast as Keith Weston. The ensemble featured James “Lil’ JJ” Lewis, Bakesta King, Michael Finn, Ericka Pinkett, Jason Raines, Steven J. Scott and Carson Pursley. The 2020 production run was halted due to the COVID-19 pandemic which led to a few rescheduling dates to premiere in early 2021 but was again delayed and resumed in October and officially closed with its final tour run in November 2021. The stage production was a -hour run. The play was received with mixed reviews.

Awards and nominations1997 Acapulco Black Film Festival Best Director: F. Gary Gray (won)1996 Independent Spirit Awards Best Supporting Female: Queen Latifah (nominated)1997 NAACP Image Awards'''
 Outstanding Lead Actress in a Motion Picture: Queen Latifah (nominated)
Outstanding Lead Actress in a Motion Picture: Jada Pinkett Smith (nominated)
 Outstanding Supporting Actor in a Motion Picture: Blair Underwood (nominated)

References

External links
 
 
 

1996 films
1996 action thriller films
1990s female buddy films
1996 crime thriller films
1990s heist films
1990s hip hop films
1996 LGBT-related films
African-American films
African-American LGBT-related films
American action thriller films
American crime action films
American crime thriller films
American female buddy films
American heist films
American LGBT-related films
1990s crime action films
Fictional portrayals of the Los Angeles Police Department
Films about bank robbery
Films directed by F. Gary Gray
Films scored by Christopher Young
Films set in Los Angeles
Films shot in Los Angeles
Girls with guns films
Hood films
LGBT-related thriller films
New Line Cinema films
1990s English-language films
1990s American films